WSCH (99.3 FM) is a radio station broadcasting a Country format. It is licensed to Aurora, Indiana, United States, and serves the Cincinnati area. The station is owned by Wagon Wheel Broadcasting, LLC.

External links
 

SCH